Shchyotkin, Schyotkin, Shchetkin, Schetkin or Shchotkin (from щетка meaning brush) is a Russian masculine surname, its feminine counterpart is Shchyotkina, Schyotkina, Shchetkina, Schetkina or Shchotkina. It may refer to
Aleksey Shchotkin (born 1991), Kazakhstani football player
Denis Shchetkin (born 1982), Kazakhstani football player

Russian-language surnames